Three Trumpets is an album by the Prestige All Stars nominally led by trumpeters Art Farmer, Donald Byrd and Idrees Sulieman, recorded in 1957 and released on the New Jazz label.

Reception

Scott Yanow of AllMusic reviewed the album, stating: "Three of the up-and-coming hard bop trumpeters of the 1950s are matched up on this jam session-flavored set. ...Although none of the songs caught on there are some fireworks during these performances".

Track listing
 "Palm Court Alley" (Idrees Sulieman) – 7:48 		
 "Who's Who?" (Art Farmer) – 6:29 		
 "Diffusion of Beauty" (Hod O'Brien) – 7:01
 "Forty Quarters" (Sulieman) – 4:34
 "You Gotta Dig It to Dig It" (Donald Byrd) – 13:30

Personnel
Art Farmer, Donald Byrd, Idrees Sulieman – trumpet 
Hod O'Brien – piano
Addison Farmer – bass
Ed Thigpen – drums
Teddy Charles – supervisor
Rudy Van Gelder – engineer

References

Art Farmer albums
Donald Byrd albums
Idrees Sulieman albums
1957 albums
Prestige Records albums
Albums recorded at Van Gelder Studio